This is the discography of British soft rock singer Chris Norman as a solo artist.

Albums

Studio albums

Live albums

Compilation albums

Singles

References

Discographies of British artists
Rock music discographies